Mark Douglas Lutz is a Canadian actor, who is best known for playing Groosalugg in the television series Angel and for writing and starring in Victor, a two-hour film on the life and death of Victor Davis.

He also guest starred in Friends.

Early life and education
At the age of 13, he moved to Hong Kong and he lived there for five years before moving to North York, Ontario. His swimming career was highlighted by setting Ontario High School records and swimming internationally for his country, including World Cups and the Olympic trials. Lutz earned a Bachelor of Arts degree in political science from the University of Guelph.

Career
Lutz starred in a biopic about the late Canadian Olympic swimmer Victor Davis. As well as starring in it, he also wrote the script and co-produced it. Victor was filmed in 2007 and was telecast on January 13, 2008, on CBC Television and was the highest rated movie-of-the-week in ten years for the network.

Lutz also appeared as the Groosalugg "Groo" on the TV series Angel. He also played James on Ghost Whisperer.

Filmography

Film

Television

External links
 

Living people
Canadian male television actors
Year of birth missing (living people)